Song Lin is a Chinese-American organic electrochemist who is an associate professor at Cornell University. His research involves the development of new synthetic organic methodologies that utilize electrochemistry to forge new chemical bonds. He is an Associate Editor of the journal Organic Letters, and serves on the Early Career Advisory Board of Chemistry - A European Journal. He was named by Chemical & Engineering News as one of their Trailblazers of 2022, a feature highlighting LGBTQ+ chemists in academia.

Early life and education 
Lin was born in Tianjin. He became interested in science as a child, doing simple household experiments, and was supported by his high school chemistry teacher to pursue a career in research. He completed his bachelor's degree in chemistry at Peking University where he worked under the supervision of Zhangjie Shi. Lin moved to the United States for graduate studies and joined the organic chemistry department at Harvard University for doctoral research, where he researched small molecule asymmetric catalysis with Eric Jacobsen.

Research and career 
Lin moved to the University of California, Berkeley for his postdoctoral research, where he worked in the lab of Christopher Chang. While studying electrocatalysis in Chang's lab, he became aware of the use of porous materials like covalent organic frameworks (COFs) to absorb carbon dioxide. In collaboration with the Yaghi group, Lin showed that porphyrin-containing COFs could catalyze the electrocatalytic reduction of CO2 to CO under applied current and in an aqueous environment.

Lin began his independent career at Cornell University where his group's research has focused on the identification of novel synthetic pathways for medicinally relevant compounds. He focuses on the use of electrochemistry to drive chemical reactions. Electrochemistry can make organic synthesis cheaper and more environmentally friendly. For example, Lin demonstrated an electrochemical approach to synthesize 1,2-diamines from alkenes, which are useful precursors to bioactive natural products, therapeutic agents, and molecular catalysts. More recently, Lin's group has developed a method to directly couple alkyl halides using electrochemistry, providing a promising approach towards this difficult chemical transformation.

Awards and honors 
 2017 Thieme Chemistry Journal Award
 2018 National Science Foundation CAREER Award
 2019 MIT Technology Review Innovators Under 35 
 2019 Alfred P. Sloan Foundation Fellowship
 2019 Office of Naval Research Young Investigator
 2020 Princeton University Bristol-Myers Squibb Lectureship
 2020 Research Corporation Cottrell Scholar Award
 2021 American Chemical Society National Fresenius Award
 2021 Camille Dreyfus Teacher-Scholar Award
 2021 FMC New Investigator Award

Selected publications

References 

Peking University alumni
Harvard University alumni
Cornell University faculty
Electrochemists
Chinese emigrants to the United States
Living people
Year of birth missing (living people)